Dunbar-Creigh House, also known as Lawrence Inn, is a historic home located at Landisburg in Perry County, Pennsylvania. It is a -story stone house built between 1794 and 1809.  The structure measures   and is built into the bank of a hillside.

It was listed on the National Register of Historic Places in 1980.

References 

Houses on the National Register of Historic Places in Pennsylvania
Houses completed in 1809
Houses in Perry County, Pennsylvania
National Register of Historic Places in Perry County, Pennsylvania